Samiran Chandra Chakrabarti is an Indian Indologist and scholar of Onomastics & Vedic Studies, Author & Editor.

He is currently Emeritus Fellow, UGC, Guest Lecturer in German, University of Calcutta, Honorary Visiting Professor, Centre for Indological Studies and Research, Ramakrishna Mission Institute of Culture.

Formerly: Retd. Director & Professor, School of Vedic Studies, Rabindra Bharati University, Head of the Department of Sanskrit, Rabindra Bharati University.

Awards and recognitions 
 Eshan Scholar; awarded Griffith Memorial Prize in Humanities, Calcutta University, 1983;
 Award from M. S. Rashtriya Vedavidya Pratisthan, Ministry of Human Resource Development, 2000;
 Rising Personalities of India Award, International Penguin Publishing House, Delhi, 2003;
 Sanskrit Day Award 2004, Bharatiya Vidya Bhavan, Calcutta;
 Rashtrapati Samman 2009, Government of India.;
 Guru Gangeshwarananda Veda-ratna Puraskara Award 2010, Bharatiya Vidya Bhavan, Mumbai.

Publications 
Books and Edited Volumes:
 Some Aspects of Vedic Studies.(ed.), Indo-Iranian Journal, Volume 40, Number 4, 1997, pp. 375–378(4) Author: Mylius K. Publisher: BRILL Publication date: 1997-10-01 
 Buddhism and World Culture (ed.) Indo-Iranian Journal, Volume 43, Number 1, 2000, pp. 77–80(4) Author: Mylius K. Publisher: BRILL 
 New selections from the Brahmanas Hardcover, Pub. 2008 
 A Study of the Pariplava: Indo-Iranian journal  1989, vol. 32, no4, pp. 255–267 
 The paribhāòsās in the âsrautasåutras Pub: Sanskrit Pustak Bhandar  (Calcutta) 1980, BL1126.46 .C48 1980 Pub ID 102-200-629 (Last edited on 2002/02/27), English 
 Brahmanasangrahah: Brahmanasamgrahah, Hardcover, Sahitya Akademi,  (81-260-1885-2)
 On the transition of Vedic sacrificial lore, INDO-IRANIAN JOURNAL, Volume 21, Number 3, 181-188,  
 The Position of the "Paribhāṣās" in the Textual Order of the "Āpastamba Śrautasūtra" The Journal of the Royal Asiatic Society of Great Britain and Ireland No. 1 (1979), pp. 31–36  Published by: Royal Asiatic Society of Great Britain and Ireland 
 The Concept of Purusarthas: The Value System as Reflected in the Vedas by Samiran Chandra Chakrabarti Th xxi+100pp May-2002 2000 
 Apastamba-Samanya-Sutra or Yajnaparibhasa Sutra – By Samiran Chandra Chakrabarti. Asiatic Society, 2007. hardcover. 2007

References

External links 
InfoWay: Samiran Chandra Chakravarti
AllTimeBooks: New Selections From The Brahmanas
 Bookfinder: Samiran Chandra Chakravarti
 IngentaConnect: Samiran Chandra Chakravarti

Living people
Indian Indologists
Sanskrit scholars from Bengal
Indian Vedic scholars
Academic staff of Rabindra Bharati University
Academic staff of the University of Calcutta
Year of birth missing (living people)